The Voice Senior is a Russian singing competition television series broadcast on Channel One. Based on the original The Voice Senior, it has aired one season and aims to find currently unsigned singing talent (solo or duets, professional and amateur) contested by aspiring singers, age 60 or over, drawn from public auditions. The winner will be determined by television viewers voting by telephone, SMS text, and The Voice App. The winners of the four seasons have been: Lidia Muzaleva, Leonid Sergienko, Dina Yudina and Mikhail Serebryakov.

The series employs a panel of four coaches who critique the artists' performances and guide their teams of selected artists through the remainder of the season. They also compete to ensure that their act wins the competition, thus making them the winning coach. The original panel featured Leonid Agutin (season 1), Pelageya (seasons 1―2), Lev Leshchenko (seasons 1―3), and Valery Meladze (season 1). The panel for the upcoming fifth season features Elena Vaenga (season 3, 5―), Valeriy Syutkin (season 5―), Igor Kornelyuk (season 5―), and Alexander Malinin (season 5―). Other coaches from previous seasons include Valeriya (season 2), Mikhail Boyarsky (season 2), Tamara Gverdtsiteli (season 3), Garik Sukachov (season 3), Stas Namin (season 4),  Laima Vaikule (season 4), Valery Leontiev (season 4), and Oleg Gazmanov (season 4).

The Voice Senior began airing on September 14, 2018, as an autumn TV season programme. In 2022, Channel One renewed the series through its fifth  series that premiered on autumn 2022.

Conception
An adaptation of the Dutch show The Voice Senior, Channel One announced the show under the name Голос. 60+ (The Voice. 60+).

In each season, the winner receives ₽1,000,000.

Selection process and format
Blind auditions
Each season begins with the "Blind auditions," where coaches form their team of artists (4 artists in season 1-2, 5 artists since season 3) whom they mentor through the remainder of the season. The coaches' chairs are faced towards the audience during artists' performances; those interested in an artist press their button, which turns their chair towards the artist and illuminates the bottom of the chair to read "Я выбираю тебя" ("I Want You"). At the conclusion of the performance, an artist either defaults to the only coach who turned around or selects his or her coach if more than one coach expresses interest.
Knockouts
The Knockouts are similar to the Sing-offs in The Voice Kids. In the "Knockout Rounds," four (or five) artists within a team sing individual performances in succession. At the conclusion of the performances, coach would decide which two of four (or five) artists get to advance to the Final.
Final
In the final live performance phase of the competition, artists perform in live show, where public voting narrows to a final group of four artists and eventually declares a winner.
Addition

In each season along with determining the winner, television viewers vote for the Best coach (but in season 2 the public didn't determinate the Best coach) using The Voice App and HbbTV option in their TV sets.

Coaches and presenter

Coaches timeline

Presenter

Dmitry Nagiev, the presenter of The Voice and The Voice Kids became the confirmed presenter on August 13, 2018.

Series overview

  Team Leonid Agutin
  Team Pelageya
  Team Lev Leshchenko
  Team Valery Meladze

  Team Valeriya
  Team Mikhail Boyarsky
  Team Tamara Gverdtsiteli
  Team Elena Vaenga

  Team Garik Sukachov
  Team Stas Namin
  Team Laima Vaikule
  Team Valery Leontiev

  Team Oleg Gazmanov
  Team Valeriy Syutkin
  Team Alexander Malinin
  Team Igor Kornelyuk

Best coach

Reception

Seasons average: Ratings
The first season premiered on September 14, 2018 with a 5.6 rating in the 18–49 demographic. For its average season rating, the show was in the Top 5 at a 5.45 ranking.

The second season premiered on September 13, 2019 with a 4.8 in the 18–49 demographic. It was down from last season's premiere by .8 rating scores.

The third season will premiere on September 4, 2020 with a 4.9 in the 18–49 demographic. It was up from last season's premiere by .1 rating scores.
Each Russian network television season starts in late August and ends in late May.

References

2010s Russian television series
2018 Russian television series debuts
Russian music television series
Channel One Russia original programming